Kroyer Films, Inc. was a pioneering animation studio formed in 1986 by animator Bill Kroyer and his wife Susan Kroyer and is one of the earliest studios to combine computer and hand-drawn animation.

Productions
Kroyer Films produced the Oscar-nominated short film Technological Threat and the 20th Century Fox feature film FernGully: The Last Rainforest. It also produced the animation for the 1994 video game Pitfall: The Mayan Adventure.

Legacy
The Academy Film Archive preserved Technological Threat in 2013.

Filmography 
Films
Technological Threat (1988) (Oscar nomination)
Troop Beverly Hills (1989) (title animation with Spümcø)
Honey, I Shrunk the Kids (1989) (title animation)
The Making of Me (1989) (animation on the sperm with Walt Disney Animation Studios)  
Christmas Vacation (1989) (title animation)
Jetsons: The Movie (1990) (vehicle animation)
FernGully: The Last Rainforest (1992)
Tom and Jerry: The Movie (1992) (computer animation)
The Thief and the Cobbler (1993) (additional animation)
Son of the Pink Panther (1993) (title animation)
Asterix Conquers America (1994) (additional animation)

TV Series
Bobby's World (1990) (title animation)
Widget the World Watcher (1990) (character designs)
Computer Warriors (1990) (TV pilot)

Video Game
Pitfall: The Mayan Adventure (1994) (original animation)

External links 
Kroyer Films at IMDb
Selected Art of the Title articles about Bill Kroyer's title sequences

References

American animation studios
Mass media companies established in 1986
American companies established in 1986
Film and television title designers
1994 disestablishments in the United States
Companies that filed for Chapter 11 bankruptcy in 1994